"Talk About Me" is a song by American record producer Dot da Genius and American rappers JID, Denzel Curry, and Kid Cudi. It was released on June 24, 2022, through Dot da Genius' HeadBanga Muzik Group imprint, as the lead single from his upcoming debut studio album. It was accompanied by a music video directed by Cole Bennett for Lyrical Lemonade.

Background and release
Dot da Genius and Kid Cudi have been collaborators for over fifteen years (as of 2022). Dot and Denzel Curry have collaborated on the latter's album, Melt My Eyez See Your Future; Curry and JID have also collaborated multiple times before. "Talk About Me" is Cudi's first collaboration with both Curry and JID. 

Work on the song began three years before the release, in 2019. The song's music was written by Dot da Genius, while the lyrics were written by the rappers.

The song is the lead single from Dot's upcoming debut album. It was announced by Cudi on June 22, 2022, in a video he posted to Twitter. It was released on June 24 through Dot's record label, HeadBanga Muzik Group.

Music video
A music video directed by Cole Bennett premiered alongside the single on June 24, 2022, on Lyrical Lemonade's official YouTube channel. It features computer-generated graphics and depicts all four of the artists in a black-and-white aesthetic, with Dot taking on the role of a "mad genius" observing the rappers from behind surveillance cameras. The video received positive feedback: Tom Breihan of Stereogum called it "slick and energetic", praising "kingmaking director Cole Bennett".

Critical reception 
"Talk About Me" received positive feedback. Hypebeast named it one of the best songs released in that week; Consequence did the same, adding that "Based on [this song] alone, Dot da Genius' debut effort deserves plenty of anticipation." Tom Breihan of Stereogum called all of the verses "great". Armon Sadler of Uproxx wrote: "It makes sense that, as [the rappers] say in the song's hook, everybody on the block is talking about them."

References

2022 songs
2022 singles
East Coast hip hop songs
JID songs
Denzel Curry songs
Kid Cudi songs
Songs written by Dot da Genius
Songs written by JID
Songs written by Kid Cudi